Crown & Manor Football Club is a football club based in Islington, England.

History
In 1939, Crown & Manor was founded following a merger between Crown Club and Hoxton Manor. In 1951, Crown & Manor were founding members of the Parthenon League, playing in the league until the 1959–60 season, when they finished third. In 1960, Crown & Manor joined the Spartan League. In 1975, Crown & Manor were founding members of the London Spartan League, following a name change. During the 1983–84 season, the club reached the fourth round of the FA Vase, before losing 5–0 away to Leyton-Wingate. In 1998, Crown & Manor left the Spartan South Midlands League, becoming founding members of the London Intermediate League. In 2003, the club joined the Middlesex County League for a three-season spell.

Ground
After the formation of the club, Crown & Manor groundshared with Cheshunt, before moving to Turkey Street in Enfield between 1974 and 1984. The club later moved to the Mile End Stadium.

Records
Best FA Cup performance: First qualifying round, 1949–50
Best FA Vase performance: Fourth round, 1983–84

References

External links

Parthenon League
Spartan South Midlands Football League
Spartan League
Middlesex County Football League
1939 establishments in England
Sport in the London Borough of Islington
Association football clubs established in 1939
Football clubs in England